Events in the year 2018 in Madagascar.

Incumbents
President: Hery Rajaonarimampianina (until September 7, Rivo Rakotovao (acting, from September 7)
Prime Minister: Olivier Mahafaly Solonandrasana (until June 6, Christian Ntsay (from June 6)

Events
November/December – The first round of the 2018 Malagasy presidential election was held on 7 November, and a second round involving the top two candidates, Andry Rajoelina and Marc Ravalomanana, was held on 19 December. On 27 December Rajoelina was announced as the winner with 56% of the vote.

Sports 
9 to 25 February – Madagascar participated at the 2018 Winter Olympics in PyeongChang, South Korea, with one competitor in alpine skiing.

Deaths

17 April – Philibert Randriambololona, Roman Catholic prelate, Bishop of Antsirabe and Archbishop of Fianarantsoa (b. 1927).

References

 
2010s in Madagascar 
Years of the 21st century in Madagascar 
Madagascar 
Madagascar